The Strange One is a 1957 American film noir about students faced with an ethical dilemma in a military college in the Southern United States. It was directed by Jack Garfein, produced by Sam Spiegel, and was adapted from a novel and stage play by Calder Willingham called End as a Man. It marked the film debut of Ben Gazzara, George Peppard and Julie Wilson. Gazzara, Pat Hingle, Mark Richman and Arthur Storch reprised their roles, after starring in the stage version. The film is noteworthy, due to the entire acting and technical staff being from the Actors Studio. It focuses on the dehumanization associated with the tradition of hazing within the college and is noteworthy for its portrayal of homoerotic themes – and at least one gay character – at a time when the Hays Code prohibited such expression.

Plot 
Cadet Staff Sergeant Jocko De Paris is a senior at the fictional Southern Military College. Using the authority of his own rank, his father's connections with the school, and the college's tradition of allowing upperclassmen to bully new cadets, De Paris effectively does what he pleases. Everyone at the school is either afraid of him or believes he is a normal or even exemplary cadet.

One night, he frames George Avery, the son of a staff member, making it appear that he got drunk and fell unconscious on the quadrangle all by himself. Cadet Avery is expelled, and De Paris sees to it that every cadet who took part in the incident lies during the investigation to conceal his own involvement. Two freshmen, along with the roommates of De Paris and the regimental commander, eventually decide to end De Paris' manipulation of them and the school. By the time De Paris is cornered in a restaurant in the nearby town, a great many cadets have banded together against him.

Laurie Corger, the regimental commander, orders him to sign a statement confessing to engineering Avery's expulsion and going to great lengths to conceal the truth from investigators. Initially reacting with smug confidence and indignant anger at being accused, De Paris finally folds and signs the statement, asking that he be allowed to leave quietly. The cadets then take him away from the restaurant and start dragging an increasingly frantic and blindfolded De Paris towards a railroad track. Instead of throwing him in front of the approaching train as he expects, they put him on board once it stops. As the train begins to move again, De Paris, having removed his blindfold, runs to the last car and rails at the watching cadets, shouting furiously, "I'll be back! I'll get you guys! You can't do this to Jocko De Paris!"

Cast
 Ben Gazzara as Cadet Sgt. Jocko De Paris*
 Pat Hingle as Cadet Harold Koble
 Mark Richman as Cadet Col. Laurie Corger
 Arthur Storch as Cadet Simmons**
 Paul E. Richards as Cadet Perrin "Cockroach" McKee ***
 Larry Gates as Maj. George Avery Sr.
 Clifton James as Col. M.N. Ramsey
 Geoffrey Horne as Cadet George Avery Jr.
 James Olson as Cadet Roger Gatt
and introducing
 Julie Wilson as Peonie aka "Rosebud"****
 George Peppard as Cadet Robert Marquales

Character Notes

* Thomas K. Schwabacher of The Harvard Crimson described Jocko as a "sadist".

** Storch used artificial buckteeth to portray his character as ugly. He did not do this in play versions.

*** According to TCM, Perrin has an attraction to Jocko.

**** Peonie is an original character to the film.

References

External links 

 
 
 
 
 

American drama films
American LGBT-related films
American black-and-white films
Columbia Pictures films
Films based on American novels
American films based on plays
Films shot in Florida
1957 drama films
1957 films
Films based on adaptations
Films produced by Sam Spiegel
Films scored by Kenyon Hopkins
1950s English-language films
1950s American films